Urfi is an Indian Marathi language film directed by Vikram Pradhan. The film starring Prathamesh Parab, Mitali Mayekar and Upendra Limaye. Music by 
Chinar–Mahesh. The film was released on 23 October 2015.

Synopsis 
Deva who works for an estate agent falls in love with the daughter of one of his clients. As he tries to create a good impression on the family and woo the girl, he is unaware of an upcoming hurdle.

Cast 
Prathamesh Parab as Deva 
Mitali Mayekar as Amruta 
Upendra Limaye
Kavita Lad
Milind Pathak

Soundtrack

Critical response 
Urfi film received negative reviews from critics. Jayanti Waghdhare of Zee News gave the film 2.5 stars out of 5 and wrote "While directing this movie, the director has given some 'twists and turns' which has affected the flow of the movie... the story of the movie also feels lost...". Mihir Bhanage of The Times of India gave the film 2.5 stars out of 5 and wrote "There are inexplicable flaws in the narrative which can only be accepted if, to use a cliched phrase, you leave your brains at home". Dipak Damle of Loksatta wrote "The director has tried to give a twist to the plot. But he did not get that much success. The impossible love story is fast forwarded. But at the same time the seriousness is lost due to meaningless dialogues, jokes and scenes". Baban Bansidhar Lihinar of Maharashtra Times gave the film 2.5 stars out of 5 and wrote "As the unimaginable story unfolds, the breach of expectation falls. Something similar has happened in this movie".

References

External links
 
 

2015 films
2010s Marathi-language films
Indian drama films